In Mandaeism, ʿZlat, also Ezlat, Īzlat, or ʿZlat Rabtia ('ʿZlat the Great'), is the wife or female consort of Shishlam, a figure representing the prototypical priest or prototypical Mandaean. Hence, Zlat symbolizes the prototypical Mandaean priestly wife as the archetype of the pure bride. She is described in the Mandaean priestly text The 1012 Questions as the "Wellspring of Light."

Zlat is also mentioned in Qolasta prayers 17, 105, 106, 171, and 173 (the Šumhata).

See also
Simat Hayyi

References

Mythological archetypes
Personifications in Mandaeism
Women and religion